2013 Dollar General 300 may refer to:

 2013 Dollar General 300 (Chicagoland)
 2013 Dollar General 300 (Charlotte)

Disambiguation pages